Kalaviṅka ( kalaviṅka; Pali: karavika;  Jiālíngpínqié; , ; ;  karawik; , Malay: karawek) is a fantastical immortal creature in Buddhism, with a human head and a bird's torso, with long flowing tail.

The kalaviṅka is said to dwell in the Western pure land and reputed to preach the Dharma with its fine voice. It is said to sing while still unhatched within its eggshell. Its voice is a descriptor of the Buddha's voice.

Edward H. Schafer notes that in East Asian religious art the Kalaviṅka is often confused with the Kinnara, which is also a half-human half-bird hybrid mythical creature, but that the two are actually distinct and unrelated.

Depictions

In Burmese art 

The karaweik is commonly used as a motif in traditional Burmese royal barges. The Karaweik located on Yangon's Kandawgyi Lake is an iconic reproduction of the karaweik royal barge.

In Chinese art
In Chinese mural art, it is portrayed as a human-headed, bird-bodied being. In the murals of Dunhuang (敦煌) they appear as figures both dancing and playing music.

In Japanese art

A well-known example is the pair of kalaviṅka carved in openwork (sukashibori) onto a Buddhist hanging ornament called the keman, used in the golden hall of Chūson-ji temple in Iwate Prefecture. The kalaviṅka from this ornament was commemorated on a 120-yen definitive stamp issued Nov. 1, 1962. The pose and general appearance on this piece is similar to the ones seen on the octagonal pedestal of the same temple (pictured right).

 In another keman from the Tokugawa period (see keman page), the creatures stand more bipedally erect and hence more humanlike.
The paired dancing is called .
A kalaviṅka painting by the brushstrokes of Hasegawa Tōhaku resides in Daitoku-ji (Kyoto), inside the  erected by tea-master Sen no Rikyū.
Painted on the ceiling of Tōfuku-ji's Sanmon gate (Kyoto).
Painted on the ceiling of Myōshin-ji's Sanmon gate (Kyoto), normally not open to public.
The  at 214 Mizusawa, in the former city of Ikaho, Gunma, Main Hall, front right ceiling, painting of a heavenly woman with eagle-like talons, anonymous.
Kawakami Sadayakko (Sada Yacco), billed as the first overseas Japanese actress, late in her life, built a villa located at Unumahōshakujichō, Kagamihara, Gifu. The villa was christened  by Itō Hirobumi, and the room with the Buddhist altar has a ceiling painting of kalaviṅka, which may be peered from outside (but access to premises only on Tuesday mornings).

In Tangut art
The Kalaviṅka is a common feature of Tangut art created during the Western Xia period (1038–1227).

In Hinduism 
Kalavinka was born from one of the head of Vishvaroopacharya who was beheaded by Indra. Indra was angry when Vishwaroopacharya was found to be praying for demons instead of gods. Indra cut his three heads which respectively became Kalavinka, Kapinjala and Tittiri (all birds)

Popular culture 
(Manga)
 RG Veda by CLAMP: Ancient Hindu mythology theme. A sickly princess character.
   by Megumi Tachikawa : based on Amano-Iwato legend. A sacred bird character.

(Novels)
 (高丘親王航海記 Prince Takaoka's voyages) by Tatsuhiko Shibusawa
  (赤目四十八瀧心中未遂 Akame forty-eight waterfall suicide pact attempt) by : Tattooed on the back of Aya, a female character.

(Music)
 Kalavinka by Buck-Tick

(Cycling)
 The Tokyo-based Tsukumo Cycle Sports's brand is Kalavinka. Many of the bikes feature the Karyōbinga kanji as well as a head badge which features the image of  the karyoubinga with the head of a bodhisattva bosatsu and the winged body of a bird.

See also
 Karaweik
 Garuda
 Gumyōchō, phoneticized: , Skr.:Jīvajīvaka - twin-headed human-bird.
 Harpie (Greek mythology)
 Putto
 Karura
 Inmyeonjo
 Kinnara

References

External links

Buddhist legendary creatures
Human-headed mythical creatures
Chinese legendary creatures
Japanese legendary creatures
Legendary birds
Pure Land Buddhism
Birds in Buddhism